Bampton may refer to:

Places

England 
 Bampton, Cumbria
 Bampton, Devon
 Bampton (Devon) railway station
Bampton Hundred
 Bampton, Oxfordshire

Other 
Bampton Island, former name of Parama Island, Papua New Guinea
Bampton Reefs, Chesterfield Islands, New Caledonia

People 
Danny Bampton (born 1980), Australian rugby league player
Dave Bampton (born 1985), English footballer
Debbie Bampton (born 1961), English footballer
John Bampton (1690–1751), English churchman for whom the Bampton Lectures are named
Mel Bampton, Australian radio announcer
Peter Bampton, Australian footballer in the 1920s
Rose Bampton (1907–2007), American opera singer

Other
 Bampton Lectures, named after John Bampton
Bampton Castle (disambiguation)
 Bampton Classical Opera, an opera company based in Bampton, Oxfordshire

See also 

 Brampton (disambiguation)